"Vainglory" is the title given to an Old English gnomic or homiletic poem of eighty-four lines, preserved in the Exeter Book. The precise date of composition is unknown, but the fact of its preservation in a late tenth-century manuscript gives us an approximate terminus ante quem.

The poem is structured around a comparison of two basic opposites of human conduct; on the one hand, the proud man, who “is the devil's child, enwreathed in flesh” (biþ feondes bearn / flæsce bifongen), and, on the other hand, the virtuous man, characterised as "God’s own son" (godes agen bearn).

External links
Old English text, The Labyrinth. Resources for Medieval Studies.
Sacred Texts - Vainglory, Sacred Texts - The Exeter Book
The Literary Encyclopedia

Old English poems